Ghar Ki Rani is a 1940 Bollywood film directed by and starring Master Vinayak.

Cast
Master Vinayak as Satyavan
Meenakshi Shirodkar as Savitri
Baburao Pendharkar		
Damuanna Malvankar		
Leela Chitnis as Arundhati

References

External links
 

1940 films
1940s Hindi-language films
Indian black-and-white films